The 2013 Moorilla Hobart International was a tennis tournament played in Australia. In the singles competition Mona Barthel, who was the defending champion, lost to Elena Vesnina in the final, 6–3, 6–4.

Seeds

Draw

Finals

Top half

Bottom half

Qualifying

Seeds

Qualifiers

Lucky losers
  Nina Bratchikova
  María Teresa Torró Flor

Draw

First qualifier

Second qualifier

Third qualifier

Fourth qualifier

References
 Main Draw
 Qualifying Draw

2013 Moorilla Hobart International
Hobart International – Singles